Top Country Albums is a chart that ranks the top-performing country music albums in the United States, published by Billboard.  In 1974, 12 different albums topped the chart, which was at the time published under the title Top Country LP's, based on sales reports submitted by a representative sample of stores nationwide.

In the issue of Billboard dated January 6, Charlie Rich was at number one with his album Behind Closed Doors.  The album had spent four weeks at number one in June and July of the previous year.  Five months after it left the top spot, it returned to number one in December, in the same week that Rich's song "The Most Beautiful Girl" reached number one on Billboards all-genre singles chart, the Hot 100.  The album would have several spells atop the chart in 1974 and eventually spend a total of 21 weeks at number one, a new record total for an album.  Rich also spent time at number one with There Won't Be Anymore and Very Special Love Songs during the year, and in total spent 21 weeks atop the chart in 1974, the most by any artist.  Problems in his personal life, however, would soon contribute to a decline in his career.

Two artists other than Rich achieved more than one number one in 1974.  Conway Twitty topped the chart with Honky Tonk Angel and Country Partners, the latter a collaboration with Loretta Lynn.  The two singers had a run of success with duet recordings in the early 1970s alongside their ongoing solo careers.  Olivia Newton-John spent time in the top spot with both Let Me Be There and If You Love Me, Let Me Know, her first two charting albums.  The success of the Anglo-Australian singer, who came from a pop music background, was controversial within the country music industry, and when she won the Female Vocalist of the Year award from the Country Music Association, some members of the organization resigned in protest.  Her focus on the country genre would be brief, however; after 1979 she would not appear on the country albums chart again for nearly 20 years.  The year's final number one album was Back Home Again by John Denver, a country-folk performer whose broad appeal made him the biggest-selling artist in America at the time.  First reaching the top spot in August, the album would have four separate runs at number one during the remainder of the year, spending a total of 12 weeks atop the listing.

Chart history

References

1974-related lists
1974
1974 record charts